Gaudencia Makokha (born 15 November 1992) is a Kenyan female volleyball player. She was part of the Kenya women's national volleyball team playing beach volleyball at the postponed 2020 Summer Olympics.

Life
She was born in 1992 and her birthplace and residence is Nairobi.

In 2017 she and her then volleyball partner, Naomi Too, reached the FIVB Beach Volleyball World Championships in Vienna, earning $3,400 in prize money.

She was in Morocco where she played at the African Beach Volleyball Olympic Games qualifiers in June 21–28.

Too was injured and she could not make the first Olympic trial. Kenya's beach volleyball coach Sammy Mulinge invited Too to the Olympic training although he was concerned by her injury. Too was not included when the volleyball players names for the Olympics were revealed on 26 June 2021. Brackcides Khadambi was called to pair up with Makokha to replace Too. Makokha/ Brackcides Khadambi and Yvonne Wavinya/ Phosca Kasisi make up Kenya's beach volleyball team. They will compete initially with the teams from Brazil, the US and Latvia in pool D. The team were waved off from Kenya by President Uhuru Kenyatta for the Olympics in Tokyo in three batches to try and minimise the chances of being effected by the COVID-19 pandemic. The Kenyan volleyballers stayed in Mombasa for training before flying to Tokyo. Makokha noted that they were the African champions, but the pandemic meant that many of their future opponents had been able to play more matches. Their first match was against Brazil on 26 August.

Clubs
  Kenya Pipeline

References

External links
 
 
 
 

1992 births
Living people
Kenyan women's volleyball players
Sportspeople from Nairobi
Beach volleyball players at the 2020 Summer Olympics
Olympic beach volleyball players of Kenya
Women's beach volleyball players
Kenyan beach volleyball players
Beach volleyball players at the 2022 Commonwealth Games